Debutantes & Centipedes is an album by bassist Trevor Dunn's band trio-convulsant which was released in 1998 on the Dutch Buzz label.

Reception

On Allmusic, Tom Schulte observed "This group mixes moody jazz with convulsive rock. ... This is a good album for people who like King Crimson and free jazz, for this album lies at the meeting point of hard, progressive rock and tough, jazz experimentalism". In JazzTimes Bill Milkowski wrote "There is a niche audience for this defiant stuff. It's the crowd that is equally open to Frank Zappa and Sonny Sharrock, Derek Bailey and Naked City, Painkiller and Mingus. Dunn seems to be drawing on all of those influences on this provocative debut, which is not for the faint of heart. But more adventurous listeners may want to go there". All About Jazz's Glenn Astarita said "Debutantes & Centipedes is sure to delight advocates of the New York City Downtown and San Francisco Bay Area scenes where "new" music is at the forefront defying stereotypes and classifications. Trio-Convulsant blend free and mainstream jazz, sub culture grunge rock or at times heavy metal as the overabundance of innovative ideas and impeccable musicianship makes this alliance a triumphant success".

Track listing
All compositions by Trevor Dunn.

 "Perfumed with Crime" – 4:08
 "An Attempt at Jealousy" – 6:31
 "Ann-Margret" – 7:25
 "Equation of the Found Object" – 6:22
 "I Remember Freakies Cereal" – 8:09
 "Premonitions" – 4:02
 "Echidna" – 4:50
 "Veiled" – 9:45
 "Aromateraphy" – 4:17

Personnel
Trevor Dunn – bass
Adam Levy – guitar
Kenny Wollesen – drums

References 

1998 albums
Trevor Dunn albums
Challenge Records (1994) albums